Valentin Ivanovich Vikhorev (born November 22, 1931, in Leningrad) is a Soviet and Russian singer-songwriter whose instrument is the seven-string guitar. Valentin is regarded as a member of the movement called Soviet "Bard" culture.

Compositions

Songs 

 Beyond Luga, beyond Luga...
 There is a backpack from farm to farm ...
 How windy and wet it is today...
 Summer goes south...
 Wet maple outside the window ...
 We will go with you to the forest for berries ...
 On the Solovetsky Islands...
 The tram left for the front ...
 We've lost our nerve...
 Jumping, jumping mailers ...
 Summer is leaning like a ripe ear ...
 There are tents in the March snow...
 August, my friend, has a cool summer day...
 The tired wedge slid down to the water...
 I would say good things to you...

Recordings 

 1988: Vikhorev V.I. “I would tell you a lot of good things..." (Melodiya)

References 

1931 births
Soviet musicians
Living people